Thomas William Urwin (9 June 1912 – 14 December 1985) was a British Labour Party politician.

Urwin worked as a trade union organiser and was divisional secretary of the Amalgamated Union of Building Trade Workers. He served as a councillor on Houghton-le-Spring Urban District Council, latterly as chairman from 1954 until 1955.

Urwin was the Member of Parliament (MP) for Houghton-le-Spring from 1964 to 1983.  He was a minister for Economic Affairs from 1968 to 1969, and for Local Government and Regional Planning from 1969 to 1970.

References

External links 
 

1912 births
1985 deaths
Amalgamated Union of Building Trade Workers-sponsored MPs
Councillors in North East England
Labour Party (UK) MPs for English constituencies
UK MPs 1964–1966
UK MPs 1966–1970
UK MPs 1970–1974
UK MPs 1974
UK MPs 1974–1979
UK MPs 1979–1983
Union of Construction, Allied Trades and Technicians-sponsored MPs
Members of the Privy Council of the United Kingdom
Ministers in the Wilson governments, 1964–1970